The women's high jump at the 2010 IAAF World Indoor Championships was held at the ASPIRE Dome on 12 and 13 March.

Medalists

Records

Qualification standards

Schedule

Results

Qualification
Qualification: Qualifying Performance 1.95 (Q) or at least 8 best performers (q) advance to the final.

Final

References

Qualification Results
Final Result

High jump
High jump at the World Athletics Indoor Championships
2010 in women's athletics